Raduč is a village in the Lika-Senj County, Croatia. The settlement is administered as a part of Lovinac municipality.

Location
It is located in Lika, 25 kilometers from Gračac, on the state road D50.

Population/Demographics
According to national census of 2011, population of the settlement is 12.

Notable people
 Milutin Tesla, Serbian orthodox priest, father of Nikola Tesla

References

External links
  

Populated places in Lika-Senj County